The International Baby Food Action Network, IBFAN, consists of public interest groups working around the world to reduce infant and young child morbidity and mortality. IBFAN aims to improve the health and well-being of babies and young children, their mothers and their families through the protection, promotion and support of breastfeeding and optimal infant feeding practices. IBFAN works for universal and full implementation of the International Code of Marketing of Breast-milk Substitutes and Resolutions.

IBFAN was set up in 1979 due to the efforts of various individuals including Gabrielle Palmer through UNICEF and the WHO.

In 1998 IBFAN received the Right Livelihood Award. The RLA Jury has honoured IBFAN “for its committed and effective campaigning over nearly twenty years for the rights of mothers to choose to breastfeed their babies, in the full knowledge of the health benefits of breastmilk, and free from the commercial pressure and misinformation with which companies promote breastmilk substitutes.”

IBFAN's principles are:
 
The right of infants everywhere to have the highest level of health.
The right of families, and in particular women and children, to have enough nutritious food.
The right of women to breastfeed and to make informed choices about infant feeding.
The right of women to full support for successful breastfeeding and for sound infant feeding practices.
The right of all people to health services which meet basic needs.
The right of health workers and consumers to health care systems which are free of commercial pressures.
The right of people to organise in international solidarity to secure changes which protect and promote basic health.

See also
Breastfeeding promotion

References

External links 
 official website
 Right Livelihood Award recipient

Infant feeding
International medical and health organizations
Organizations established in 1979